Thomas Wilson (5 May 1865 – 19 May 1933) was an Australian miner and a member of the Queensland Legislative Assembly. He was also Mayor of Brisbane in 1909 and 1925.

Biography
Wilson was born in Riddells Creek, Victoria, to parents James Wilson and his wife Mary (née McLean). He was educated in Riddells Creek. As a young man, he left home to work in the primary industries and later as a shearer in the Riverina district. He then worked at the Cobar copper mine and came to Queensland in 1884 where he invested in mining and pastoral pursuits.

In 1890 he married Emma Brown (died 1952) in Rockhampton and together had two sons and two daughters. He was a keen sportsman and a member of the Tattersalls Club. Wilson died in office in May 1933, and was accorded a state funeral which proceeded from his New Farm residence to the Toowong Cemetery.

Public career
Wilson was associated with the Labour Party from its very early days of existence. He was an alderman on the Brisbane City Council, winning the ward of Merthyr in 1905 and holding it for the next sixteen years. During that time he was a member of the Brisbane Metropolitan Water and Sewerage Board. In 1909 he was Mayor of Brisbane and held the distinction of welcoming Lord Kitchener when he visited Brisbane on New Year's Day, 1910. In 1925 he was once again Mayor for a short period.

Following the death of David Bowman in 1916, Wilson won the seat of Fortitude Valley in the Queensland Legislative Assembly. He held the seat until his death in 1933, and was Minister for Public Instruction from 1925 until 1929. As minister he initiated many reforms for the welfare of school children and a lasting tribute to his name was the Wilson Ophthalmic School at Windsor. The Wilson Hospital was a specialised facility where eye diseases in children from country Queensland could be diagnosed and treated.

References

Members of the Queensland Legislative Assembly
1865 births
1933 deaths
Burials at Toowong Cemetery
Australian Labor Party members of the Parliament of Queensland
People from Riddells Creek